Anna Accensi Abella (born 1 January 1970) is a Spanish rower. She competed in the 1996 Summer Olympics.

References

1970 births
Living people
Rowers at the 1996 Summer Olympics
Spanish female rowers
Olympic rowers of Spain
People from Montsià
Sportspeople from the Province of Tarragona